Gilles Roussi (born 7 January 1947 in Konstanz, West Germany) is a French sculptor.

External links
Official site

20th-century French sculptors
French male sculptors
21st-century French sculptors
21st-century French male artists
1947 births
Living people
People from Konstanz
Artists from Baden-Württemberg